Vysoký Újezd may refer to:

Vysoký Újezd (Benešov District)
Vysoký Újezd (Beroun District)
Vysoký Újezd (Hradec Králové District)